George Locke Howe (1898–1977) was an intelligence operative in World War II, an author, and architect in the Washington, D.C., area.  His 1949 novel Call It Treason, drawn from his war experience using captured German soldiers to re-enter the Third Reich to gather intelligence, earned him a first prize cash award in a contest by the Christophers, "an organization devoted to bringing Christian principles into everyday life." The novel was turned into a 1951 Hollywood film, Decision Before Dawn.

World War II and novel

O.S.S. Operative 
During the war, Howe served with the Office of Strategic Services (O.S.S.), the precursor of the Central Intelligence Agency. Working for an O.S.S. detachment with the U.S. Seventh Army in France, Howe provided documents and cover stories for German P.O.W. soldiers recruited to re-enter the Reich in the last months of the war to collect intelligence. According to writer Joseph E. Persico, the "handsome and urbane architect of middle age  . . . seemed to take a childlike delight in this late-blooming career in professional deception." There was nothing childlike in the missions the German soldier-recruits undertook, however. They "confronted German land mines and machine-gun nests on the way out and American defenses on the way back." They also faced detection—and execution—in Nazi Germany itself.

The Saga of "Happy" 
Call It Treason and the film based on it addressed these dangers by focusing on one young German soldier-recruit code-named "Happy."  In the novel, he is fatally shot by a German soldier as he attempts to swim the Rhine River and return to American lines.  In the film, Happy is captured and executed by German soldiers after creating a diversion so an American intelligence officer can safely swim the Rhine to re-cross into American lines. Suggesting the factual basis of his novel, Howe dedicated the book "To Happy 1925-45." In a foreword to the novel, the author reprinted a sorrowful 1947 letter he had  received from Happy's father seeking information about his son's fate. At the book's end, the author recounts that he had responded to the original letter from Happy's father, telling him what had happened to his son.  The novel ends with a second letter from the father, noting that both he and his wife were grateful to Howe "for having seen as deep into our boy's heart as only we had seen." The authenticity of the father's letters is fairly clear. In fact, a contemporary review of the book in The New York Times noted that it was based "upon an actual episode. Its general authenticity is beyond doubt."

According to an obituary in The Washington Post, Howe wrote the novel while recovering from serious injuries in a car accident. He wrote various other novels and short stories and also had poems published in The New Yorker.

Architecture career and death 
Howe graduated from Harvard College in 1918 and served with the U.S. Navy in Ireland during World War I.  He earned a master's in architecture in 1925 and practised with his architect-father, Wallis Eastburn Howe, in Providence, Rhode Island. He moved to Washington, D.C., in the 1930s where he worked with the Public Buildings Administration. He entered private practice with a series of partners from 1940 to the early 1960s, becoming a prominent architect in the capital. His firms were credited with designing and constructing more than 600 buildings, many erected in Georgetown. He died at 79 on June 19, 1977, after surgery at a Veterans Administration Hospital in Salem, Virginia.

References

1898 births
1977 deaths
United States Navy personnel of World War I
Harvard University alumni
People of the Office of Strategic Services
Architects from Washington, D.C.
Architects from Rhode Island
20th-century American architects